Katherin Nuevo Segura (born 24 October 2002) is a Cuban sprint canoeist. 

She qualified at the 2020 Summer Olympics, in the C-1 200 meters, and C-2 500 meters. 

She competed at the 2019 ICF Canoe Sprint World Championships. and at the 2021 Canoe Sprint World Cup.

References

External links

Cuban female canoeists
Living people
2002 births
Canoeists at the 2020 Summer Olympics
Olympic canoeists of Cuba
ICF Canoe Sprint World Championships medalists in Canadian
Pan American Games medalists in canoeing
Pan American Games gold medalists for Cuba
Canoeists at the 2019 Pan American Games
Medalists at the 2019 Pan American Games
21st-century Cuban women